Sar Chaqa (also Romanized as Sar Chaqā, Sar Choghā, Sar Choqā, and Sarchūqāh) is a village in Darreh Seydi Rural District, in the Central District of Borujerd County, Lorestan Province, Iran. At the 2006 census, its population was 54, in 16 families.

References 

Towns and villages in Borujerd County